Saidabad (also Romanized as Sa‘īdābād and Saiyidābād; also known as Sa‘id Abad Kharaghan Gharbi) is a village in Hesar-e Valiyeasr Rural District, Central District, Avaj County, Qazvin Province, Iran. At the 2006 census, its population was 93, in 24 families.

References 

Populated places in Avaj County